Class of '83 is a 2020 Indian Hindi-language crime thriller film produced by Red Chillies Entertainment and directed by Atul Sabharwal for Netflix. The film is based on the book "The Class of 83" and tells the story of a hero policeman shunted to a punishment posting as the dean of the police academy. Class of '83 is Netflix's third collaboration with Red Chillies Entertainment, following the original series Bard of Blood and Betaal. The film premiered on 21 August 2020 on Netflix.

Synopsis

Class of 83, which is based on a book authored by leading crime journalist Hussain Zaidi, is set in Bombay in the 1980s when the underworld’s stranglehold on the city was becoming hard to break. Dozens of young men rendered jobless as a result of the ongoing mill strike were being lured into joining local gangs, and the nexus between powerful politicians and criminal gang leaders made it hard for the police to weed out the problem. With this as the backdrop, the film follows an ideological cop-turned-trainer who moulds five cadets into encounter specialists.

Yanked off the field for doing his job with more integrity than those in power would like him to, upright officer Vijay Singh (Bobby Deol) lands a ‘punishment posting’ as the dean of the Police Training Centre in Nashik. Convinced that the only way to restore order in a flawed system is to fix it from the inside, he handpicks a clutch of bold young officers and trains them to bend the law in service of the larger good.

Inspired from real accounts of the city’s first encounter specialists, the film depicts how the officers shrewdly planned and executed hits while staying within the system and following all necessary protocols. But then it quickly slips into a predictable rise-and-fall-and-rise narrative with egos and corruption breaking up the friends, and a last-ditch shot at redemption triggered by their mentor.

Cast

 Bobby Deol as Additional Director General of Police Officer Vijay Singh, the husband of Sudha Singh 
 Bhupendra Jadawat as Pramod Shukla
 Geetika Tyagi as Sudha Singh, the wife of Vijay Singh.
 Anup Soni as Manohar Patkar
 Joy Sengupta as DGP Raghav Desai
 Vishwajeet Pradhan as Mangesh Dixit
 Hans Dev Sharma as YP Mathur
 Hitesh Bhojraj as Vishnu Varde
 Sameer Paranjape as Aslam Khan
 Ninad Mahajani as Laxman Jadhav
 Prithvik Pratap as Janardan Surve

 Abhishek Bhalerao as Bombay Police with Vishnu Varde

Production
The filming began in the first week of May 2019.

Release 
Class of '83 was streamed on OTT Platform Netflix from 21 August 2020.

References

External links
 
 

Indian direct-to-video films
Indian action thriller films
2020 films
2020s Hindi-language films
Red Chillies Entertainment films
Hindi-language Netflix original films
2020 action thriller films